Sir James William Foots      (12 July 1916 – 21 August 2010) was an Australian mining engineer and Chairman of Mount Isa Mines and Chancellor of the University of Queensland.

Early life 
James William Foots was born in Jamieson, Victoria on 12 July 1916, the son of William Foots, who worked as an explosives expert in the Jamieson gold mines and his wife Ethel Allen. His mother died when he was three, and he and his brother were raised by their grandparents. He attended Coburg High school where he completed his studies as the Dux of the school. He won a scholarship to attend the University of Melbourne, but was compelled to complete another matriculation year, when it was felt he was too young to attend University. He graduated with a degree in Mining Engineering in 1937.

Career 
Foots took up work at the Zinc Corporation mine in Broken Hill, and married Thora Thomas in 1939. During World War II, he and colleague, George Fisher worked on the creation of underground fuel storage tanks in Darwin during persistent bombing raids, before returning to work in Captain's Flat and Broken Hill in 1946. Foots moved to Mount Isa Mines, Queensland in 1952. He rose to the position of general manager of Mount Isa Mines Limited in 1955, succeeding George Fisher. Foots continued to lead the company later as chief executive and chairman of MIM Holidings Ltd, where he helped the group to expand metal production of lead, silver, copper and zinc.

Foots was appointed to the Senate of The University of Queensland in 1970, and also held the position of Inaugural Chairman of The University of Queensland Foundation from 1982 to 1985. He was a governor of the foundation until 1992. He helped to establish the Julius Kruttschnitt Mineral Research Centre in 1970, in recognition of Kruttschnitt's work in Mt Isa and in helping to develop the Silver Mine acquired by the university in Indooroopilly.

Foots was chancellor of The University of Queensland from 1985 to 1992. He was director of Uniquest from 1993 to 1997.

He was a chairman of Westpac from 1987 to 1989. He was president of the Australian Mining Council and the Australasian Institute of Mining and Metallurgy in 1974. He was on the board of Castlemaine Toohey's Limited from 1983 to 1985, the National Mutual Life Association of Australasia Limited from 1982 to 1985 and ASARCO Incorporated 1985–1987.

Foots died in Caloundra, Queensland on 21 August 2010. He was survived by his children and grandchildren. His wife Thora died in May 2010.

Legacy 
Foots established a number of scholarships to support students in Mining Engineering, Chemical Engineering and Metallurgical Engineering. A building was also named in his honour at the St Lucia campus of The University of Queensland. 

A bridge in Mount Isa bears his name (2009).

Honours 

 1972 – Australasian Institute of Mining and Metallurgy Medal.
 1975 – Foots was appointed Knight Bachelor in the 1975 New Year Honours in recognition of his services to the mining industry.
 1975 – University of Melbourne Kernot Memorial Medal.
 1976 - Fellow of the Australian Academy of Technological Sciences and Engineering (FTSE).
 1979 – Australian Institute of Management John Storey Medal.

 1982 – Honorary Doctorate of Engineering from The University of Queensland in 1982.
 1982 – J.P. Thompson Foundation Gold Medal.
 1984 – Advance Australia Award.
 1985 – The Salvation Army Distinguished Auxiliary Service Cross.
 1986 – Federal Republic of Germany Commander's Cross of the Order of Merit.
 1987 – Mining and Metallurgy (UK) Gold Medal
 1989 – Gold Medal, Company Director's Association of Australia (Qld).

 1992 – Officer of the Order of Australia (AO)
 1993 – Aus I.M.M. Beryl Jacka Award.

 2001 – Centenary Medal
 2004 – Civilian Service Medal 1939–45 (Darwin Service 1943–1944).

 1972 Rotary International Paul Harris Fellow.
 1977 Honorary Fellow, The Institution of Mining and Metallurgy, London.
 1985 Honorary Member, The Australasian Institute of Mining and Metallurgy.
 1987 Life Member, The Canadian Institute of Mining and Metallurgy
 2001 Life Member, Australian Mining Hall of Fame.
 2003 Inducted into the Australian Prospectors and Miners Hall of Fame.

Memberships 

 1956 Member of council, The Australasian Institute of Mining and Metallurgy.
 1960 Member of the C.S.I.R.O. Advisory Council.
 1971 Member, Red Shield Appeal Committee, The Salvation Army, Brisbane.
 1989 Member, Mater Hospitals Trust Board.

References 

1916 births
2010 deaths
Australian business and financial journalists
Australian mining engineers
Australian Knights Bachelor
Officers of the Order of Australia
Recipients of the Centenary Medal
University of Queensland
Westpac people